The following is a list of events and releases that have happened or are expected to happen in 2023 in music in the United States.

Notable events

January
6 – Iggy Pop released his first studio album in four years, Every Loser.
9 – Pentatonix performed the National Anthem at the College Football Playoff National Championship at SoFi Stadium in Inglewood, California.
13 – Jason Crabb released his first studio album in nearly five years, Miracle in A Manager.
 Obituary released their first studio album in six years, Dying of Everything.
 Miley Cyrus released "Flowers", her first single since 2021. The song has gone on to break multiple Spotify records, including the most-streamed song in one week. The record was previously held by Adele's "Easy on Me".
19 – Rock and Roll Hall of Fame inductee David Crosby died at the age of 81.
20 – Easton Corbin released his first studio album in eight years, Let's Do Country Right.
24 – After 19 years, Brendon Urie announced that he was discontinuing Panic! at the Disco after the Viva Las Vengeance Tour finished, so he can focus on his family.
27 – The Arcs released their first album in eight years, Electrophonic Chronic.
Bass Drum of Death released their first studio album in five years, Say I Won't.
Meg Baird released her first studio album in eight years, Furling. 
Tyler Hubbard of Florida Georgia Line released his self-titled debut solo studio album.
Elle King released her first studio album in five years, Come Get Your Wife. It is her first true country music album.
King Tuff released his first studio album in five years, Smalltown Stardust.
31 – The Smashing Pumpkins released act two of their three-part rock opera album, Atum.

February
3 – All Out War released their first studio album in four years, Celestial Rot.
Terry Blade released his third studio album, Ethos: Son of a Sharecropper.
5 – The 65th Grammy Awards took place at the Crypto.com Arena in Los Angeles, California. Beyoncé and Maverick City Music took home the most awards with four each. Harry Styles won Album of the Year for Harry's House, Lizzo won Record of the Year for "About Damn Time", Bonnie Raitt won Song of the Year for "Just Like That" and Samara Joy won Best New Artist.
8 – Composer, songwriter, producer, and pianist Burt Bacharach passed away at the age of 94.
10 – Paramore released their first studio album in six years, This Is Why.
Quasi released their first studio album in ten years, Breaking The Balls Of History.
Kelela released her first studio album in six years, Raven.
Pierce the Veil released their first studio album in seven years, The Jaws of Life. It is their first album without co-founder and drummer Mike Fuentes, who had left the band in 2017 following sexual misconduct allegations.
12 – Chris Stapleton performed National Anthem, Sheryl Lee Ralph performed Lift Every Voice and Sing, and Rihanna performed the halftime show during Super Bowl LVII at State Farm Stadium in Glendale, Arizona.
14 – Caroline Polachek released her first studio album in four years, Desire, I Want to Turn Into You.
17 – Jordan Davis released his first studio album in five years, Bluebird Days.
P!nk released her first studio album in four years, Trustfall.
Skrillex released his first solo studio album in nine years, Quest for Fire. It was followed by his next album, Don't Get Too Close, a day later.
24 – Godsmack released their first studio album in five years, and reportedly their final album, Lighting Up the Sky.
Steel Panther released their first studio album in four years, On the Prowl.
 Dope released their first studio album in seven years, Blood Money, Part Zer0.
 Dierks Bentley released his first studio album in five years, Gravel & Gold.

March
3 – Macklemore released his first studio album in nearly six years, BEN.
10 – Miley Cyrus released her eighth studio album, Endless Summer Vacation.
 19 years after its formation as a band, Panic! at the Disco performed its final concert at AO Arena in Manchester, England.
 Story of the Year released their first studio album in six years, Tear Me to Pieces.
 Periphery released their first album in four years, Periphery V: Djent Is Not a Genre.
17 – Kamelot will release their first album in five years, The Awakening.
Chelsea Grin will release the second half of their double album, Suffer In Heaven.
24 – Fall Out Boy will release their first studio album in five years, So Much (for) Stardust.
 Meg Myers will release her first studio album in five years, TZIA.
31 – Welshly Arms will release their first album in five years, Wasted Words & Bad Decisions.
 Andrew McMahon's solo project, Andrew McMahon in the Wilderness, will release its first album in nearly 5 years, Tilt at the Wind No More.
 Samiam will release their first studio album in nearly 12 years, Stowaway.
 Supergroup Boygenius will release their debut album and first release in five years, The Record.

April
2 – The CMT Music Awards will take place at the Moody Center in Austin, Texas. This will be the first time the ceremony will take place outside of Nashville.
7 – Mudhoney will release their first studio album in five years, Plastic Eternity.
14 – Metallica will release their first studio album in nearly seven years, 72 Seasons.
 Overkill will release their first studio album in four years, Scorched.
23 – The Smashing Pumpkins will release the full three-act rock opera album Atum: A Rock Opera in Three Acts.
28 – The National will release their first studio album in four years, First Two Pages of Frankenstein.
 Smokey Robinson will release Gasms, his first studio album in six years, his first non-Christmas album in nine years and his first album of all-new original material in 14 years.

May
4 – Blink-182 will begin their first tour with founding member Tom DeLonge since 2014.
5 – Jonas Brothers will release their first studio album in four years, The Album. 
12 – Cattle Decapitation will release their first studio album in four years, Terrasite.
19 — Dave Matthews Band will release their first studio album in five years, Walk Around the Moon.
26 – Foo Fighters will co-headline the 2023 Boston Calling Music Festival, the band's first official performance since former drummer Taylor Hawkins' death in March 2022.
 Matchbox Twenty will release their first album in 11 years, Where the Light Goes.

June
2 – Ben Folds will release his first studio album in eight years, What Matters Most.
 Jake Shears will release his first studio album in five years, Last Man Dancing.
 Rival Sons will release their first studio album in four years, Darkfighter. It will be followed by a companion album, Lightbringer, to be released later in the year.
 The Revivalists will release their first studio album in nearly five years, Pour It Out Into the Night.
 Avenged Sevenfold will release their first studio album in seven years, Life Is but a Dream...
9 – Extreme will release their first album in 15 years, Six.
23 – Portugal. The Man will release their first album in six years, Chris Black Changed My Life.

November
19 – The Billboard Music Awards will take place.

First quarter
Swans will release their first studio album in four years.

Third quarter
Jennifer Lopez will release her first studio album in five years, This Is Me... Now.

Unknown date
Anthrax will release their first studio album in seven years.
Atrophy will release their first studio album in 33 years.
Bad Religion will release their first studio album in four years.
Kelly Clarkson will release her first studio album of all original material in six years.
Dangerous Toys will release their first studio album in 28 years.
Dark Angel will release their first studio album in 32 years.
Death Angel will release their first studio album in four years.
Living Colour will release their first studio album in six years.
LL Cool J will release his first studio album in ten years.
Metal Church will release their first studio album in five years.
Janelle Monáe will release her first studio album in five years.
Morbid Angel will release their first studio album in six years.
Nile will release their first studio album in four years.
Rancid will release their first studio album in six years.
The Rods will release their first studio album in four years.
Social Distortion will release their first studio album in twelve years.
Staind will release their first studio album in twelve years.
Suicidal Tendencies will release their first studio album of all original material in seven years.
Trouble will release their first studio album in ten years.
Vektor will release their first studio album in seven years.
Whiplash will release their first album in fourteen years.

Bands reformed
Chimaira
The Color Morale

Bands disbanded
Panic! at the Disco

List of albums released

January

February

March

List of albums set to be released

March

April

May

June
{|class="wikitable"
! Date
! Album
! Artist
! Genre (s)
|-
|rowspan="5"|2
|What Matters Most
|Ben Folds
|Alternative rock
|-
|Pour It Out Into the Night
|The Revivalists
|Alternative rock
|-
|Darkfighter
|Rival Sons
|
|-
|Last Man Dancing
|Jake Shears
|
|-
| Life Is but a Dream...
| Avenged Sevenfold
| Heavy metal
|-
|9
|Six
|Extreme|
|-
|16
|I Want More|Donny McCaslin
|
|-
|23
|Chris Black Changed My Life|Portugal. The Man
|
|}

Unknown date
First quarterTBA by Swans

Third quarterThis Is Me... Now by Jennifer Lopez

TBATBA by Agent SteelTBA by AnthraxTBA by AtrophyTBA by Bad ReligionTBA by blink-182TBA by ChevelleTBA by Kelly ClarksonTBA by DååthTBA by Dangerous ToysTBA by Dark AngelTBA by Death AngelTBA by Doja CatTBA by Dream TheaterTBA by DredgTBA by ExodusTBA (EP) by FidlarTBA by The KillersTBA by Living Colour
 TBA by LL Cool JThis Is Me... Now by Jennifer LopezTBA by Metal ChurchTBA by Janelle MonáeTBA by Morbid AngelTBA by NileTBA by The OffspringTBA by RancidTBA by The RodsTBA by SevendustTBA by Social DistortionTBA by StaindTBA by Suicidal TendenciesBlossom, Pt. 2 by The Summer SetTBA by TestamentTBA by TroubleTBA by The UsedTBA by UziTBA by VektorTBA by Vicious RumorsTBA (EP) by Vio-lenceTBA by Whiplash

Top songs on record
Billboard Hot 100 No. 1 Songs
"All I Want for Christmas Is You" – Mariah Carey 
"Anti-Hero" – Taylor Swift 
"Flowers" – Miley Cyrus 
"Die for You" – The Weeknd and Ariana Grande 
"Last Night" – Morgan Wallen 

Billboard Hot 100 Top 20 Hits
All songs that reached the Top 20 on the Billboard Hot 100 chart during the year, complete with peak chart placement.

Deaths
January 1 −
Gangsta Boo, 43, rapper (Three 6 Mafia)
Fred White, 67, funk drummer (Earth, Wind & Fire)
January 6 – Danny Kaleikini, 85, Hawaiian pop singer
January 10 – Dennis Budimir, 84, jazz and rock guitarist (The Wrecking Crew)
January 12 – Lisa Marie Presley, 54, pop rock singer-songwriter
January 15 – C. J. Harris, 31, singer and American Idol'' season 13 contestant
January 18 –
Van Conner, 55, rock bassist (Screaming Trees)
David Crosby, 81, folk rock guitarist (The Byrds, Crosby, Stills, Nash & Young)
January 26 – Dean Daughtry, 76, Southern rock keyboardist (Atlanta Rhythm Section)
January 28 – Tom Verlaine, 73, rock guitarist (Television)
January 31 – Charlie Thomas, 85, R&B singer (The Drifters)
February 8 – Burt Bacharach, 94, composer, songwriter, producer, pianist
February 12 – Trugoy the Dove, 54, rapper (De La Soul)
February 17 – Kyle Jacobs, 49, country music songwriter, musician
February 18 – Tom Whitlock, 68, pop rock songwriter
March 5 – Gary Rossington, 71, Southern rock guitarist (Lynyrd Skynyrd)
March 14 – Bobby Caldwell, 71, American singer

See also
2023 in music

References

2023 in American music